Lyric Suite may refer to:

Lyric Suite (Berg), a six-movement work for string quartet by Alban Berg (1925–26)
Lyric Suite (Grieg), an orchestration of four of the six piano pieces from Book V of Edvard Grieg's Lyric Pieces, Op. 54
Lyric Suite, Op. 30, a four-movement work for string trio by Bernard Stevens (1958)
Lyric Suite, a four-movement work for euphonium and wind ensemble by Donald H. White (1978)
Lyric Suite, a work for bassoon and piano by Thomas Dunhill
Lyric Suite, a work by Ferenc Szabó
Lyric Suite, a five-movement work by Robert Morris (composer)
Lyric Suite, a four-movement work by Walter Hartley
Lyric Suite, Op. 51, a four-movement work for cello and piano by Leevi Madetoja (1922)
Lyric Suite, a seven-movement work for piano trio by Gloria Coates (1993/96)
Lyric Suite No. 2, a work for flute, cello and piano by Gloria Coates (2002)
Lyric Suite for Sextet, an album for piano, vibraphone and string quartet by Chick Corea and Gary Burton (1983)
Lyric Suite, a series of ink-on-rice-paper drawings by Robert Motherwell (1965)
Lyric Suite, a play by Frank Corsaro
Lyric Suite, a dance by Anna Sokolow (1953)